Carl Schröter may refer to:

 Carl Schröter (politician) (1887–1952), German politician
 Carl Joseph Schröter (1855–1939), Swiss botanist